Yusuf Fırat Kaplan (born 16 July 1998) is a Turkish professional football player who plays for an amateur club Ortaca Belediyespor as a midfielder.

Professional career
Fırat made his debut for Adanaspor in a 4-3 TFF First League win over Elazığspor on 16 May 2015. He made his professional debut in a 1-1 Süper Lig tie with Konyaspor on 19 May 2017.

References

External links
 
 

1998 births
Sportspeople from Hakkari
Living people
Turkish footballers
Association football midfielders
Adanaspor footballers
Süper Lig players
TFF First League players
TFF Third League players